Bitmap format is:

 Generic term for file formats for raster graphics images
 Specific term for Windows bitmap (BMP) or X Bitmap (XBM) file format